Jean-Pierre van Besouw (died 2017) was president of the Royal College of Anaesthetists from 2012 to 2015.

He was an anesthetist at St George's University Hospitals NHS Foundation Trust.

References

Presidents of the Royal College of Anaesthetists
British anaesthetists
Living people
Year of birth missing (living people)